This page lists all described species of the spider family Stenochilidae accepted by the World Spider Catalog :

Colopea

Colopea Simon, 1893
 C. laeta (Thorell, 1895) — Myanmar, Thailand
 C. lehtineni Zheng, Marusik & Li, 2009 — China
 C. malayana Lehtinen, 1982 — Thailand, Malaysia, Singapore
 C. pusilla (Simon, 1893) (type) — Philippines
 C. romantica Lehtinen, 1982 — Bali
 C. silvestris Lehtinen, 1982 — New Guinea
 C. tuberculata Platnick & Shadab, 1974 — Fiji
 C. unifoveata Lehtinen, 1982 — Borneo
 C. virgata Lehtinen, 1982 — Thailand, Vietnam
 C. xerophila Lehtinen, 1982 — New Guinea

Stenochilus

Stenochilus O. Pickard-Cambridge, 1871
 S. crocatus Simon, 1884 — Myanmar, Cambodia, Sri Lanka
 S. hobsoni O. Pickard-Cambridge, 1871 (type) — India
 S. scutulatus Platnick & Shadab, 1974 — India

References

Stenochilidae